The Bournemouth Aviation Museum is an aviation museum located next to Bournemouth International Airport, near the village of Hurn in Christchurch. It houses a number of aircraft, aero engines, cockpits and a limited number of ground vehicles.

History
The museum was founded in May 1998 as the Jet Heritage Museum and was located on the property of Bournemouth Airport. However, the following year it was renamed Bournemouth Aviation Museum. Then, due to expansion of the airport, in 2008 the museum was forced to move to a site near the Adventure Wonderland theme park on the south side of the B3073 road.

In 2013, the museum acquired a Boeing 737-200 named "The Spirit of Peter Bath" and has created an exhibition about Sir Peter Bath and his company Bath Travel inside the fuselage.

Collection

Aircraft on display

 Avro Vulcan B.2 (MRR) XH537 – Nose section only
 BAC One-Eleven ZE432 – Forward fuselage only
 British Aerospace 125 ZD620
 British Aerospace Jetstream 31 640 – Nose section only
 Boeing 737-200 21135
 BAC Jet Provost T.5A XW310
 CMC Leopard 001
 Colombian MC-12 Cri-Cri 12-0135
 de Havilland Vampire T.11 XE856
 English Electric Canberra PR.7 WT532 – Nose section only
 English Electric Lightning F.53 ZF582 – Nose section only
 Gloster Meteor NF.14 WS776
 Grumman American AA-1B 0245
 Grumman AA-5 Tiger 0979
 Handley Page Herald 175
 Handley Page Victor K.2 XL164 – Nose section only
 Hawker Hunter F.6 XG160
 Hunting Jet Provost T.3 XM404
 North American Harvard IIB Composite
 Percival Provost T.1 WW450/WW421
 Radioplane Shelduck D.1 XR346/XV383/XW578
 SEPECAT Jaguar GR.1 XX763
 Vickers Vanguard – Nose section only
 Vickers Viscount 263 – Nose section only
 Westland Wasp HAS.1 XT431
 Westland Wessex HAS.3 XT257

Engines on display

 Bristol Siddeley Orpheus
 Daimler-Benz DB 601
 Junkers Jumo 211
 Rolls-Royce Avon 
 Rolls-Royce Griffon
 Rolls-Royce Nene 
 Rolls-Royce Viper

See also
List of aerospace museums

References

External links

Official website

Aerospace museums in England
Aviation